The Solomon Cup is the top knockout tournament of the Telekom S-League, an association football cup competition in the Solomon Islands. It is played by senior male football clubs from the top division.

There is also the Youth Solomon Cup, held for U-16 and U-19 division clubs.

Winners 

 1991 -   Honiara Warriors       4-2 Western Turtles        [aet]
 1992 -   Honiara Warriors       4-0 Guadalcanal Hornets
 1993 -    abandoned
 1994 -   Guadalcanal Hornets    draw Honiara Warriors       [7-6 pen]
 1995 -     no competition
 1996 -   Honiara Warriors       2-0 Malaita Eagles
 1997 -   Malaita Eagles         3-2 Guadalcanal Hornets
 1998 -   Honiara Warriors       1-0 Malaita Eagles
 1999 -   Malaita Eagles         1-0 Temotu Arrows
 2000-04 -  no competition
 2005 -   Honiara Warriors       2-1 Temutu Arrows          [aet]
 2006 -     no competition
 2007 -   East Honiara Lions     1-0 Central Honiara Eels   [U-23]
 2008 -     no competition
 2009 -   Malaita Eagles         8-0 Guadalcanal Hornets
 2010-16 -  no competition
 2017 -   Malaita Eagles         2-1 Central Shields

Notes 
- In 2007 no senior men's tournament was held, only for U-23 teams

References 

1990s establishments in the Solomon Islands
Football competitions in the Solomon Islands
National association football cups